Bomachoge Borabu is a constituency in Kenya. It is one of nine constituencies in Kisii County. It was established after the promulgation of the new Constitution in 2010. It was established for the 2013 general elections.

Members of Parliament

Kenyenya Sub-county
Kenyenya Sub-county shares common boundaries with Bomachoge Borabu Constituency. The Sub-county is headed by the sub-county administrator, appointed by a County Public Service Board.

References 

Constituencies in Kisii County